Millu (Aymara for a kind of salpeter, Quechua for salty, Hispanicized spelling Millo) may refer to:

 Millu (Apurímac), a mountain in the Apurímac Region, Peru
 Millu (Ayacucho), a mountain in the Ayacucho Region, Peru
 Millu (Cusco), a mountain in the Cusco Region, Peru
 Millu (Moquegua), a mountain in the Moquegua Region, Peru
 Millu (Moquegua-Puno), a mountain on the border of the Moquegua Region and the Puno Region, Peru

See also 
 Millu Urqu, a mountain in Bolivia